Rwanda–United States relations are bilateral relations between Rwanda and the United States.

According to the 2012 U.S. Global Leadership Report, 76% of Rwandans approve of U.S. leadership, with 17% disapproving and 7% uncertain.

History 

U.S. Government interests have shifted significantly since the 1994 genocide from a strictly humanitarian concern focusing on stability and security to a strong partnership with the Government of Rwanda focusing on sustainable development.  The largest U.S. Government programs are the President's Emergency Plan for AIDS Relief (PEPFAR) and the President's Malaria Initiative, which aim to reduce the impact of these debilitating diseases in Rwanda. Other activities promote rural economic growth and support good governance and decentralization. Overall U.S. foreign assistance to Rwanda has increased fourfold over the past four years.

A major focus of bilateral relations is the U.S. Agency for International Development's (USAID) program. In support of the overall Government of Rwanda development plan, USAID aims to improve the health and livelihoods of Rwandans and increase economic and political development. To achieve this, USAID activities focus on:
 Prevention, treatment and care of HIV/AIDS;
 Reducing mortality and morbidity due to malaria;
 Increasing access to, and use of, voluntary family planning methods;
 Improving maternal and child health;
 Promoting rural economic growth through specialty coffee, dairy, and eco-tourism;
 Encouraging participatory governance and decentralization in 12 target districts;
 Promoting a democratic Rwanda, where the government respects human rights, civil liberties, and the rule of law; and
 Providing food aid to the most vulnerable populations.

The Mission is currently implementing a number of activities related to the goals above, and is working closely with the Millennium Challenge Corporation (MCC) to obtain approval of the Threshold Country Plan submitted by the Government of Rwanda in November 2007. Once approved, the plan will be implemented by USAID and will focus on strengthening the justice sector and civic participation, and promoting civil rights and liberties.

The State Department's Public Affairs section maintains a cultural center in Kigali, which offers public access to English-language publications and information on the United States.

American business interests have been small; currently, private U.S. investment is limited to the tea industry, franchising (FedEx, Coca-Cola, Western Union, and MoneyGram) and small holdings in service and manufacturing concerns. Annual U.S. exports to Rwanda, under $10 million annually from 1990 to 1993, exceeded $40 million in 1994 and 1995. Although exports decreased in the years immediately after the genocide, in 2007 they were estimated at approximately $17 million, a 20% increase over 2006.

Principal U.S. Officials include Ambassador Donald W. Koran, Deputy Chief of Mission Jessica Lapenn, and USAID Program Director George Lewis.

The current Rwandan ambassador to the United States is Mathilde Mukantabana.

Diplomatic missions 

The Embassy of Rwanda in Washington, D.C. is Rwanda's diplomatic mission to the United States of America. It is also accredited to Argentina, Brazil, and Mexico. The embassy is located in Italianate row house at 1714 New Hampshire Avenue NW in the Dupont Circle neighborhood.

The U.S. maintains an embassy in Kigali, Rwanda.

Recent news
In July 2013, the US warned Rwanda to immediately end its support for the March 23 Movement rebels in the Democratic Republic of Congo, after evidence was found that Rwandan military officials were involved.

In November 2015, the US criticized a vote by Rwandan lawmakers to approve a change to their constitution to allow President Paul Kagame to serve a third term. A State Department spokesman did not explicitly threaten that US aid to its traditionally close African friend would be cut, but warned ties could be reviewed.

See also
Foreign relations of Rwanda
Foreign relations of the United States

References

External links
History of Rwanda - U.S. relations

 
Bilateral relations of the United States
United States